Sab John is an Indian screenwriter and actor who works in Malayalam and Tamil-language films. He is known for his work in the films Chanakyan (1989), Gunaa (1991) and Soorya Manasam (1992)

Career 
Sab John made his debut as a writer with the thriller film Chanakyan (1989). The story of the film was created in 18 days and he wrote a 450-page script for the film with director T. K. Rajeev Kumar. He made his Tamil debut the following year with the romantic film Gunaa. After writing the scripts for several Malayalam films including Vyooham (1990) and Gandhari (1992), he returned to Tamil cinema with Sillunu Oru Kadhal (2006).

Filmography

As a writer 
Chanakyan (1989)
Kshanakkathu (1990)
Vyooham (1990)
Gunaa (1991)
Soorya Manasam (1991)
Gandhari (1992)
Bharanakoodam (1994)
Gandheevam (1994)
Highway (1995)
Mayilpeelikkavu (1998)
Priyam (2000)
Sillunu Oru Kadhal (2006)
Sivappu Mazhai (2010)

As an actor 
Kuruthipunal (1995)
Sathyameva Jayathe (2000)

References

External links 

Indian screenwriters
Screenwriters from Kerala
Malayalam screenwriters
Tamil screenwriters
Year of birth missing (living people)
Living people